Lakeside is an unincorporated community in Chelan County, Washington. It is part of Wenatchee–East Wenatchee Metropolitan Statistical Area.

References

Unincorporated communities in Chelan County, Washington
Unincorporated communities in Washington (state)